Sombun Phong-aksara was a Thai medical doctor. He graduated medicine from the Faculty of Medicine Siriraj Hospital, and obtained master's and doctorate degrees in public health from Harvard University and Johns Hopkins University, respectively. His work focused on the tuberculosis situation in Thailand, and as the director of the Department of Disease Control's Chest Disease Clinic, led the first nationwide tuberculosis-control plan in the 1950s. He was the first President of the Medical Council of Thailand, and served as Deputy Minister of Public Health.

References

Sombun Phong-aksara
Sombun Phong-aksara
Sombun Phong-aksara
Sombun Phong-aksara
Harvard School of Public Health alumni
Johns Hopkins Bloomberg School of Public Health alumni
Sombun Phong-aksara
Year of birth missing
Year of death missing